Amy Thompson (born 28 July 1994) is a Luxembourger international footballer who plays as a forward for FC Mamer 32.

Thompson returned to the national team in 2022 after a four-year absence and currently is Luxembourg's all-time leading scorer with 20 goals.

International goals

Honours 
Progrès Niederkorn
Runners-up
 Dames Ligue 1: 2011–12
 Luxembourg Women's Cup: 2011–12

External links

External links 
 

1994 births
Living people
Women's association football forwards
Luxembourgian women's footballers
Sportspeople from Luxembourg City
Luxembourg women's international footballers
1. FC Saarbrücken (women) players
Luxembourgian expatriate footballers
Luxembourgian expatriate sportspeople in Germany
Expatriate women's footballers in Germany
Luxembourgian expatriate sportspeople in the United States
Expatriate women's soccer players in the United States
2. Frauen-Bundesliga players